Between a Rock and a Hard Place was the final studio album from Australian rock band Australian Crawl. It was produced by English producer Adam Kidron (Ian Dury, Cabaret Voltaire, Aztec Camera).

Disappointed with sales, the band was ready to split but had to go out on tour for the next year to pay off the enormous $400,000 cost of producing the album.

Track listing
All songs were written by James Reyne, except where otherwise noted.

"Two Can Play"  (Simon Hussey, James Reyne) - 3:48
"I'd Do It" - 3:33
"Divers Down" - 3:07
"If This Is Love" - 3:26
"Two Hearts" (Simon Hussey, James Reyne) - 3:55
"Trouble Spot Rock" - 4:46
"You Told Me" (Simon Hussey, James Reyne) - 3:06
"My Day At The Beach" - 3:51
"Always The Way" (Simon Hussey, James Reyne) - 5:37
"Newly Weds In The Morning" - 3:07
"Land Of Hope And Glory" - 5:08

Personnel
Credits (taken from album's back cover and liner notes):

Australian Crawl
 James Reyne - vocals, rhythm guitars (tracks 1, 3-4 & 7-8), guitars (tracks 2 & 10), acoustic guitars (tracks 3-4 & 6), marimba (track 1), harp (track 10), saxophones (track 10)
 Brad Robinson - keyboards (tracks 1, 3-9 & 11), clavinet (track 2), synthesizer (track 10), backing vocals (track 6)
 Simon Binks - guitars (tracks 1-9 & 11), guitar solo (track 10)
 John Watson - drums, timbales (track 7), marimba (track 11)
 Harry Brus - bass, guitar (track 7)
 Mark Greig - guitars (tracks 2-3, 6, 9 & 11)

Additional musicians
 John Barrett - saxophone
 John Courtney - trombone
 Rahmlee Michael Davis - trumpet
 Ric Formosa - guitar, brass arrangement
 Cheryl Freeman - background vocals
 Michael Harris - trumpet
 Bill Harrower - saxophone
 Chelli Jackson - background vocals
 Keith Johnson - saxophone
 Don Lock - trombone
 Peter Martin - saxophone
 Don Myrick - saxophone (alto)
 Mick O'Connor - organ (Hammond)
 Phenix Horns - brass
 Eddie Rayner - keyboards
 Pete Salt - trumpet
 Lui Lui Satterfield - trombone
 Bob Venier - trumpet
 Zan - background vocals
 Allan Zavod - piano

Charts

References

1985 albums
Australian Crawl albums
albums produced by Adam Kidron